The 2010 Copiapó mining accident, also known then as the "Chilean mining accident", began on 5 August 2010, with a cave-in at the San José copper–gold mine, located in the Atacama Desert  north of the regional capital of Copiapó, in northern Chile.

After the state-owned mining company, Codelco, took over rescue efforts from the mine's owners, exploratory boreholes were drilled. Seventeen days after the accident, a note was found taped to a drill bit pulled back to the surface: "Estamos bien en el refugio los 33" ("We are well in the shelter, the 33 of us").

Three separate drilling rig teams; nearly every Chilean government ministry; the United States' space agency, NASA; and a dozen corporations from around the world cooperated in completing the rescue. On 13 October 2010, the men were winched to the surface one at a time, in a specially built capsule, as an estimated 5.3 million people watched via video stream worldwide.
With few exceptions, they were in good medical condition with no long-term physical effects anticipated.
Private donations covered one-third of the US$20 million cost of the rescue, with the rest coming from the mine owners and the government.

Previous geological instability at the old mine and a long record of safety violations for the mine's owners, San Esteban Mining Company, had resulted in a series of fines and accidents, including eight deaths, during the dozen years leading up to this accident. After three years, lawsuits and investigations into the collapse concluded in August 2013 with no charges filed.

Background

Chile's long tradition in mining has made the country the world's top producer of copper. An average of 34 people per year since 2000 have died in mining accidents in Chile, with a high of 43 in 2008, according to figures from the state regulatory agency "National Geology and Mining Service" ( abbreviated to SERNAGEOMIN).

The mine is owned by the San Esteban Mining Company, ( abbreviated to CMSE), a company notorious for operating unsafe mines. According to an official with the non-profit Chilean Safety Association, (also known as ACHS) eight workers died at the San José site between 1998 and 2010 while CMSE was fined 42 times between 2004 and 2010 for breaching safety regulations. The mine was shut down temporarily in 2007 when relatives of a miner killed in an accident sued the company; but the mine reopened in 2008 despite non-compliance with regulations. Due to budget constraints, there were only three inspectors for the Atacama Region's 884 mines during the period leading up to the most recent collapse.

Prior to the accident, CMSE had ignored warnings over unsafe working conditions in its mines. According to Javier Castillo, secretary of the trade union that represents San José's miners, the company's management operates "without listening to the voice of the workers when they say that there is danger or risk". "Nobody listens to us. Then they say we're right. If they had believed the workers, we would not be lamenting this now", said Gerardo Núñez, head of the union at a nearby Candelaria Norte mine.

Chilean copper mine workers are among the highest-paid miners in South America. Although the accident has called mine safety in Chile into question, serious incidents at large mines are rare, particularly those owned by the state copper mining company (Codelco) or by multinational companies. However, smaller mines such as the one at Copiapó have generally lower safety standards. Wages at the San Jose Mine were around 20% higher than at other Chilean mines due to its poor safety record.

Collapse

The collapse occurred at 14:00 CLT on 5 August 2010.
Access to the depths of the mine was by a long helical roadway.
One man, an ore-truck driver, was able to get out, but a group of 33 men were trapped deep inside. A thick dust cloud caused by the rock fall blinded the miners for as much as six hours.

Initially, the trapped miners tried to escape through ventilation shafts, but the ladders required by safety codes were missing.

Luis Urzúa, the shift supervisor, gathered his men in a room called a "refuge" and organized them and their resources. Teams were sent out to assess the vicinity.

Initial search

Rescuers attempted to bypass the rockfall at the main entryway through alternative passages but found each route blocked by fallen rock or threatened by ongoing rock movement. After a second collapse on 7 August, rescuers were forced to use heavy machinery while trying to gain access via a ventilation shaft. Concerns that additional attempts to pursue this route would cause further geological movement halted attempts to reach the trapped miners through previously existing shafts, and other means to find the men were sought.

The accident happened soon after sharp criticism of the government's handling of the Chilean earthquake and tsunami. Chile's President, Sebastián Piñera, cut short an official trip and returned to Chile in order to visit the mine.

Out-of-date mine shaft maps complicated rescue efforts, and several boreholes drifted off-target due to drilling depth and hard rock. On 19 August, one of the probes reached a space where the miners were believed to be trapped, but found no signs of life.

For days the miners had heard drills approaching and had prepared notes, which they attached to the tip of the drill with insulation tape when it poked into their space. They also tapped on the drill before it was withdrawn, and these taps could be heard on the surface. When the drill was withdrawn a note was attached to it:  (English: "All 33 of us are fine in the shelter"). The words became the motto of the miners' survival and the rescue effort, and appeared on websites, banners and T-shirts.
Hours later, video cameras sent down the borehole captured the first grainy, black-and-white, silent images of the miners.

Survival

Although the emergency supplies stocked in the shelter were intended to last only two or three days, through careful rationing, the men made their meager resources last for two weeks, only running out just before they were discovered.

After leaving the hospital, miner Mario Sepúlveda said, "All 33 trapped miners, practicing a one-man, one-vote democracy, worked together to maintain the mine, look for escape routes, and keep up morale. We knew that if society broke down, we would all be doomed. Each day a different person took a bad turn. Every time that happened, we worked as a team to try to keep the morale up." He also said that some of the older miners helped to support the younger men, but all have taken an oath of silence not to reveal certain details of what happened, particularly during the early weeks of desperation.

Videos sent to the surface
Shortly after their discovery, 28 of the 33 miners appeared in a 40-minute video recorded using a mini-camera delivered by the government via 1.5-metre-long (5 ft) blue plastic capsules called palomas ("doves", referring to their role as carrier pigeons). The footage showed most of the men in good spirits and reasonably healthy, though they had all lost weight.

The men appeared mainly bare-chested and bearded. They were all covered with a sheen of sweat due to the high heat and humidity of the mine at that depth. Several of the miners looked very thin, and some were camera-shy. The host, Sepúlveda, avoided specifics about the health of the men and used the vague term "complicated" to refer to their situation. He did, however, work to maintain an upbeat attitude, and insisted that things were looking brighter for the trapped men. The video generally portrays a positive, light atmosphere despite the grim circumstances.

Leadership
"It's been a bit of a long shift", foreman Luis Urzúa joked. A man whose level-headedness and gentle humor is credited with helping keep the miners under his charge focused on survival during their 70-day underground ordeal, Urzúa kept his cool in his first audio contact with officials on the surface. He glossed over the hunger and despair he and his men felt, saying, "We're fine, waiting for you to rescue us."

Urzúa credited majority decision-making for the trapped men's good esprit de corps and dedication to their common goal. "You just have to speak the truth and believe in democracy", he said. "Everything was voted on; we were 33 men, so 16 plus one was a majority."

Following the collapse of the mine on 5 August, Urzúa  had dispatched men to find out what had happened and see if escape was possible, but they could not find an exit route. "We were trying to find out what we could do and what we could not", said Urzúa. "Then we had to figure out the food." Urzúa tried to instill a philosophical acceptance of fate so they could accept their situation and move on to embrace the essential tasks of survival.

Key members of the trapped group
 Luis Urzúa (54), the shift foreman who immediately recognized the gravity of the situation and the difficulty of any rescue attempt. He gathered the men in a secure "refuge" then organized them and their meager resources to cope with a long-term survival situation. Just after the incident, he led three men to scout the tunnel. After confirming the situation, he made detailed maps of the area to aid the rescue effort. He directed the underground aspects of the rescue operation and coordinated closely with engineers on the surface over the teleconference links.
 Florencio Ávalos (31), second in command of the group, assisted Urzúa in organizing the men. Because of his experience, physical fitness and emotional stability, he was selected as the first miner to ride the rescue capsule to the surface in case of complications during the 15-minute ascent in the cramped shaft. Naturally shy, he served as the camera operator for videos sent up to the miners’ families. He was trapped along with his younger brother Renan.
 Yonni Barrios (50), became the medic of the trapped miners due to his six months of training he took to care for his elderly mother. He served the group by monitoring their health and providing detailed medical reports to the team of doctors on the surface. His fellow miners jokingly referred to him as "Dr. House", an American TV medical drama character.
 Mario Gómez (63), the eldest miner, became the religious leader of the group, organizing a chapel with a shrine containing statues of saints as well as aiding counseling efforts by psychologists on the surface.
 José Henríquez (54), a preacher and a miner for 33 years, served as the miners' pastor and organized daily prayers.
 Mario Sepúlveda (40), served as the energetic host of the miner's video journals that were sent to the surface to reassure the world that they were doing well. The local media dubbed him "Super Mario" after the Super Mario Bros. video game for his energy, wit and humor.
 Ariel Ticona (29), served as the group's communications specialist, installing and maintaining the underground portion of the telephone and videoconferencing systems sent down by the surface team.

Health of the trapped miners

On 23 August, the first voice contact was made with the miners. Doctors reported that the miners had been provided with a 5% glucose solution and a drug to prevent stomach ulcers caused by food deprivation. Material was sent down the mine in palomas, which took an hour to reach the miners. Delivery of solid food began a few days later. Relatives were permitted to write letters, but were asked to keep them optimistic.

Out of concern for their morale, rescuers were reluctant to tell the miners that in the worst-case scenario, the rescue might take months, with an eventual extraction date close to Christmas. However, on 25 August, the trapped men were fully briefed on the projected timeline for their rescue and the complexity of the plans involved. The mining minister later reported that the men took the potentially negative news very well.

Rescue workers and consultants described the miners as a very disciplined group. Psychologists and doctors worked alongside the rescue teams to ensure the miners were kept busy and mentally focused. The men below ground confirmed their ability to contribute to the rescue operation, saying "There are a large number of professionals who are going to help in the rescue efforts from down here." Psychologists believed that the miners should have a role in their own destiny as it was important to maintain motivation and optimism.

Sanitation became an important issue in the hot, humid environment underground, and the miners took steps to maintain hygiene throughout their ordeal.

Environmental and safety issues were also a primary concern.

Chilean Health Minister Jaime Mañalich stated, "The situation is very similar to the one experienced by astronauts who spend months on end in the International Space Station." On 31 August, a team from NASA in the United States arrived in Chile to provide assistance. The team included two physicians, one psychologist, and an engineer.

After the rescue, Rodrigo Figueroa, chief of the Trauma Stress and Disaster unit of the Pontifical Catholic University of Chile, said there were serious shortcomings in the censorship of letters to and from miners' relatives above ground and in the monitoring of activities they could undertake, as being underground had suddenly turned them back into "babies." Nevertheless, the natural strength of "the 33" kept them alive, and their natural organization into teams as a response to disaster was also part of the innate human response to threat. Figueroa went on to say that as the miners' sound minds had seen them through, they would continue to be tested as they resumed life above ground.

Religious aspects

The trapped miners, most of whom were Roman Catholic, asked for religious items, including Bibles, crucifixes, rosaries, and statues of the Virgin Mary and other saints to be sent down to them. After Pope Benedict XVI sent each man a rosary, these were brought to the mine by the Archbishop of Santiago, Cardinal Francisco Javier Errázuriz Ossa in person. After three weeks in the mine, one man who had been civilly married to his wife 25 years earlier asked her to enter into a sacramental marriage.
The men set up a makeshift chapel in the mine, and Mario Gómez, the eldest miner, spiritually counseled his companions and led daily prayers.

Among the miners, a number attributed religious significance to events. Mario Sepúlveda said, "I was with God, and with the Devil – and God took me." Mónica Araya, the wife of the first man rescued, Florencio Ávalos, noted: "We are really religious, both my husband and I, so God was always present. It is a miracle, this rescue was so difficult, it's a grand miracle."

Both government representatives and the Chilean public have repeatedly credited Divine Providence with keeping the miners alive while the Chilean public viewed their subsequent rescue as a miracle. Chile's president Sebastián Piñera stated, "When the first miner emerges safe and sound, I hope all the bells of all the churches of Chile ring out forcefully, with joy and hope. Faith has moved mountains." When Esteban Rojas stepped out of the rescue capsule, he immediately knelt on the ground with his hands together in prayer then raised his arms above him in adoration. His wife then wrapped a tapestry bearing the image of The Virgin Mary around him as they hugged and cried.

Tent city and the families
 (Camp Hope) was a tent city that sprang up in the desert as word of the mine's collapse spread. At first, relatives gathered at the mine entrance and slept in cars as they waited and prayed for word on the rescue operation's progress. As days turned into weeks, friends brought them tents and other camping supplies to provide shelter from the harsh desert climate. The encampment grew with the arrival of more friends and relatives, additional rescue and construction workers, and members of the media. Government ministers held regular briefings for the families and journalists at the camp. "We're not going to abandon this camp until we go out with the last miner left", said María Segovia, "There are 33 of them, and one is my brother".

Many members of the miners' families at Camp Hope were devout Catholics who prayed almost constantly for the men. As they waited, worried families erected memorials to the trapped men, lit candles and prayed. On a nearby hill overlooking the mine, the families placed 32 Chilean and one Bolivian flag to represent their stranded men. Small shrines were erected at the foot of each flag and amongst the tents, they placed pictures of the miners, religious icons and statues of the Virgin Mary and patron saints.

As the families became more organized, the government took steps to provide some comforts, eventually providing a more private area for the relatives to avoid constant interrogation by the energetic press corps. Infrastructure such as a kitchen, canteen area, sanitary facilities and security were later added. Bulletin boards sprouted up and the local government established shuttle bus stops. Over time a school house and children's play zones were built while volunteers worked to help feed the families. Clowns entertained the children and organizations provided emotional and spiritual comfort to the waiting families. Police and soldiers were brought in from Santiago to help maintain order and security with some patrolling the desert perimeter on horseback. In many respects the camp gradually grew into a small city.

Rescue plans
Exploratory boreholes were used to locate the trapped miners, with several of these subsequently used to supply the men. The Chilean government developed a comprehensive rescue plan modeled on the successful 2002 US Quecreek Mine rescue, itself based on the 1963 German Wunder von Lengede rescue operation. Both previous rescues had used a "rescue pod" or capsule to winch trapped miners to the surface one by one. Chilean rescue crews planned to use at least three drilling technologies to create bore holes wide enough to raise the miners in custom-designed rescue pods as quickly as possible. "The mine is old and there is concern of further collapses", Henry Laas, managing director of Murray & Roberts Cementation, one of the companies involved in the rescue operation, said, "The rescue methodology therefore has to be carefully designed and implemented."

Drilling plans
Three large escape boreholes were drilled concurrently using several types of equipment provided by multiple international corporations and based on three different access strategies. When the first (and only) escape shaft reached the miners, the three plans in operation were:
 Plan A, the Strata 950 (702 meter target depth at 90°)
 Plan B, the Schramm T130XD (638 meter target depth at 82°) was the first to reach the miners
 Plan C, a RIG-421 drill (597 meter target depth at 85°)

Plan A
Plan A used an Australian built Strata 950 model raise borer type drilling rig often used to create circular shafts between two levels of a mine without using explosives. Provided by South African mining company Murray & Roberts, the drill had recently finished creating a shaft for Codelco's Andina copper mine in Chile and was immediately transferred to the San José Mine. The Strata 950 was the first of the three drills to begin boring an escape shaft. If the pilot hole had been completed, further drilling would have caused rock debris to fall down the hole, requiring the miners to remove several tons of debris.

Plan B

This drill team was the first to reach the trapped miners with an escape shaft. Plan B involved a Schramm Inc. T130XD air core drill owned by Geotec S.A. (a Chilean-American joint venture drilling company) that was chosen by Drillers Supply SA (the general contractor of Plan B) to widen one of the three 14 centimetre (5.5 in) boreholes that were already keeping the miners supplied with palomas. Normally, the drills are used to drill top holes for the oil and gas industry and for mineral exploration and water wells. This system employed Chilean Drillers Supply SA (DSI) personnel, Mijali Proestakis G.M. and Partner, Igor Proestakis Tech Mgr, Greg Hall C.E.O. (who joined his team on site for the last eight days of drilling) and their 18-centimetre (7 in) drill pipe air core drill, a team of American drillers from Layne Christensen Company and specialized Down-The-Hole drilling hammers from Center Rock, Inc., of Berlin, Pennsylvania. Center Rock's president and personnel from DSI Chile were present on-site for the 33 days of drilling. While the Schramm rig, built by privately held Schramm, Inc. of West Chester, Pennsylvania, was already on the ground in Chile at the time of the mine collapse, additional drilling equipment was flown from the United States to Chile by United Parcel Service. The percussion-technology hammer drill can drill at more than  a day by using four hammers instead of one.

The Schramm T-130 was directed to bore toward the workshop, a space that was accessible by the miners. The T-130 became operational on 5 September and worked in three stages. First, it needed to enlarge the 14-centimetre (5.5 in) hole to a 30-centimetre (12 in) hole. It then needed to drill the 30-centimetre (12 in) hole into a 71 centimetre (28 in) diameter hole. "If we tried to drill from a 14-centimetre (5.5 in) hole to a 71-centimetre (28 in) hole, the torque would be too high and it would ... put the drill bits under too much pressure," said Schramm, Inc. Latin American Regional Manager, Claudio Soto. However by reusing the same hole, there was still added pressure on the drill. Delays occurred because of issues with the neck of the drills caused by the angle of the drilling. Rescuers were unable to drill vertically since that would require placing the heavy rig on the unstable ground where the cave-in had happened, and the rescuers also had to avoid drilling into the production tunnels above the shelter. Soto added, during the rescue, "It's a difficult hole. It's curved and deep. The hard rock has proven to be abrasive and has worn out the steel of the drill."

Plan C

Plan C involved a Canadian-made RIG-421 oil drilling rig operated by Calgary-based Precision Drilling Corporation. It was the last drill to be added to the rescue process and went into operation on 19 September. The rig, normally used for oil and gas well drilling, could theoretically drill a wide enough escape shaft in a single pass without a pilot hole. Chosen for the rescue operation because it can drill large holes deep into the ground and is faster than mining drills, this plan suffered major setbacks due to the difficulty of aiming a large drill at such a small target. Furthermore, the hardness of the rock caused the drill bit to wander from its intended course and it then needed to be removed, resized and repositioned, slowing drilling progress. Many family members of the miners initially had high hopes for this rig, but it was forced to reduce its drill size and so lagged behind the other attempts.

Drilling results
At 08:05 CLDT on 9 October 2010, Plan B's Schramm T130XD was the first to reach the trapped miners. By 8 October, the Plan A Strata 950's pilot hole had reached only  of the required depth, and had not yet started widening its shaft. Plan C's RIG-421, the only machine at the site able to drill a wide enough escape shaft without a pilot hole, reached .

The rescue operation was an international effort that involved not only technology, but the cooperation and resources of companies and individuals from around the world, including Latin America, South Africa, Australia, the United States and Canada. NASA specialists helped develop a sophisticated health agenda. Though international participation was critical to success, overall, it was a Chilean-led team effort. As one NASA specialist said during a visit early on in the rescue: "The Chileans are basically writing the book."

Extraction plans

Fénix rescue capsule

While the three drilling operations progressed, technicians worked on building the rescue capsules that would eventually carry the miners to safety. Several media organizations produced illustrations of the capsules' basic design.<ref name=capsuletopview>{{cite news | url=https://abcnews.go.com/meta/search/imageDetail?format=plain&source=http%3A%2F%2Fabcnews.go.com%2Fimages%2FBusiness%2F3b7bc91554324d38aec4208ee4964c47 | title=Fénix 2''' Rescue Capsule, top view, opened (Online Graphic) | work=ABC News | date=14 September 2010}}</ref>

The steel rescue capsules, dubbed Fénix (English: Phoenix) were constructed by the Chilean shipbuilding company Astilleros y Maestranzas de la Armada (ASMAR) with design input from NASA. The navy incorporated most of NASA's suggestions and produced three rescue pods: Fénix 1, 2 and 3, all enhanced versions of the Dahlbusch Bomb used for mine rescue. Fénix 1 was presented to journalists and the miners' relatives for their assessment.

The eventual capsule used to rescue the 33 men was the Fénix 2, a device  in diameter, narrow enough to avoid hitting the sides of the tunnel. It had retractable wheels to allow for a smoother ride to the surface, an oxygen supply, lighting, video and voice communications, a reinforced roof to protect against rock falls, and an escape hatch with a safety device to allow the passenger to lower himself back down if the capsule became stuck.

Preparations for extraction
Although drilling finished on 9 October 2010, Laurence Golborne, Chilean Minister of Mining, announced that the rescue operation was not expected to begin before 12 October due to the complex preparatory work required on both the escape shaft and the extraction system site. These tasks included a borehole inspection to determine how much of the shaft needed casing to prevent rockfalls from jamming the escape capsule. Depending on the shaft casing requirement, installation of the requisite steel pipes could take up to 96 hours. After that, a large concrete platform for the winching rig to raise and lower the capsule had to be poured while the winching rig required assembly. Finally, thorough testing of the capsule and winching system together was required.

Golborne also indicated he expected only the first  of the shaft to be cased, a task that could be performed in only 10 hours. In the end, only the first  were deemed to require casing. Assembly of a safe lifting system took an additional 48 hours.

Shortly before the extraction phase began, Golborne told reporters that rescuers estimated it would take about an hour to bring each miner to the surface. He therefore expected the lifting phase of the rescue operation to take up to 48 hours.

Rescue operation San Lorenzo

The rescue effort to retrieve the miners began on Tuesday, 12 October at 19:00 CLT. Dubbed  (Operation St. Lawrence) after the patron saint of miners,"Operation St. Lawrence a success, all 33 Chilean miners saved", Asia News, 14 October 2010 a three-hour initial delay ensued while final safety tests were carried out. At 23:18 CLT, the first rescuer, Manuel González, an experienced rescue expert and employee of Codelco, was lowered into the mine. González arrived in the collapsed mine and made contact with the miners at 23:36.

Extraction
Although Chilean officials played down the risks of the rescue, the miners still needed to be alert during the ascent in case of problems. As a result, and according to the rescue plan, the first four men to be brought up the narrow shaft were those "deemed the fittest of body and mind". Thereafter they would be best placed to inform the rescue team about conditions on the journey and report on the remaining miners. Once the four men had surfaced, the rescues proceeded in order of health, with the least healthy brought up from the mine first.

Procedure
Six hours before the rescue, each miner switched to a liquid diet rich in sugars, minerals, and potassium. Each took an aspirin to help avert blood clots, and wore a girdle to stabilize blood pressure. The miners also received moisture-resistant coveralls and sunglasses to protect against the sudden exposure to sunlight. The capsule included oxygen masks, heart monitors, and video cameras.
Piñera was present for each arrival during the 24-hour rescue.

After an alertness check, a miner would be taken by stretcher to a field hospital for initial evaluation; none needed immediate treatment.

Rescue

The original plan called for two rescue workers to descend into the mine before bringing the first miner to the surface. However, to avoid delay, rescuers decided to bring a miner to the surface in the returning capsule that had taken González down. An "empty" trial run had taken place the previous day, with the capsule stopping just  before the end of the shaft.

15 minutes later, after a further safety check, miner Florencio Ávalos began his ascent from the mine. TV cameras both inside the mine and on the surface captured the event and broadcast it worldwide. Urzúa was the last to ascend.

Each transit of the capsule, whether up or down, was projected to take 15 minutes, giving a total time of 33 hours for the rescue operation. In practice, after the capsule's first few transits, it became apparent that the trip might be shorter than the projected 15 minutes, and each rescue cycle should take less than 1 hour. As the eighteenth miner was brought to the surface, Chilean Mining Minister Laurence Golborne stated, "We have advanced at a faster time than we originally planned. I foresee we might conclude the whole operation before tonight."

After stepping free from the rescuers and greeting his son, Urzúa embraced Piñera, saying, "I've delivered to you this shift of workers, as we agreed I would." The president replied, "I gladly receive your shift, because you completed your duty, leaving last like a good captain." Piñera went on to say, "You are not the same after this, and Chile won't be the same either."

A large Chilean flag that had hung in the mine chamber during the rescue was brought up by Luis Urzúa. Once all the miners had been extracted, the rescuers in the mine chamber displayed a banner reading  ("Mission accomplished Chile"). Manuel González was the first rescuer down and the last up, spending 25 hours 14 minutes in the mine. Rescuers needing to sleep did so in the mine to avoid tying up the capsule on rescue-delaying journeys to the surface. When the last rescuer surfaced, Piñera covered the top of the rescue shaft with a metal lid.

Order of miners and rescuers

Before the rescue, the trapped miners were divided into three groups to determine their exit order. This grouping was based on the theory that the first men to exit should be those more skilled and in the best physical condition, as they would be better equipped to escape unaided in the event of a capsule malfunction or shaft collapse. They were also thought more able to communicate clearly any other problems to the surface rescue team. The second group included miners with medical problems, older men, and those with psychological issues. The final group comprised the most mentally tough, as they had to be able to endure the anxiety of the wait; in the words of Minister Mañalich, "they don't care to stay another 24 hours inside the mine".

The leaving order was as shown below:

Note: Early in the disaster, the Chilean newspaper El Mercurio published a widely circulated, but incorrect, early list of the miners' names with two errors: it omitted Esteban Rojas and Claudio Acuña, and wrongly included the names of Roberto López Bordones and William Órdenes. The list above is correct and up to date according to the Ministry of Mining website.

Notes:
 The extraction times for the rescuers are correct but may be out of order and not listed next to the actual corresponding rescue worker.
 "Down trip no." is the sequence number of the capsule journey that he was sent down on.

Timeline of events

This is a general chronology of the events, from the beginning:
 
 
 
 
 
 
 
 
 
 
 
 
 
 
 
 
 
 

Reaction to the rescue

Chilean President Sebastián Piñera and First Lady Cecilia Morel were present during the rescue. Bolivian President Evo Morales was also scheduled to be there but did not arrive in time to see the rescue of the trapped Bolivian miner, Carlos Mamani. Morales visited Mamani at a hospital along with Piñera later in the day. A number of foreign leaders contacted Piñera to express solidarity and pass on congratulations to Chile while rescue efforts were underway. They included the Presidents of Argentina, Brazil, Colombia, Peru, South Africa, Uruguay, Venezuela,"Historic rescue completed" , South African Government, 14 October 2010 and Poland, as well as the Prime Ministers of the United Kingdom, Spain and Ireland, (who also wrote personally to the Chilean president and the Clare-based designers and manufacturers of the rescue drill). Other foreign leaders including Mexican President Felipe Calderón and US President Barack Obama praised the rescue efforts and passed on their hopes and prayers to the miners and their families. Pope Benedict XVI left a video message in Spanish praying for the success of the rescue operation.

After the successful rescue, Piñera gave a speech on location in which he praised Chile, saying that he was "proud to be the president of all Chileans." He invoked Chile's recently passed Bicentennial celebrations and said that the miners were rescued with "unity, hope and faith." He thanked Hugo Chávez and Morales, amongst others, for their calls of support and solidarity. He also said that those responsible for the collapse of the mine would be punished, and that there would be a "new deal" for the workers.Presidente Piñera tras el rescate de los 33 mineros: "Chile hoy día está más unido y más fuerte que nunca" (Spanish), Chilean Presidential Web Site, Speech Extracts, 13 October 2010

Miners post-rescue
All but two of the men went home within 48 hours of their rescue, and by 19 October all had left the hospital.

Doctors felt the men had coped unexpectedly well physically with their time underground. Piñera even challenged the men to a friendly football game and invited them to visit the presidential palace and the opening of a transcontinental highway.

Marc Siegel, an associate professor of medicine at the New York University Langone Medical Center, said that lack of sunlight could cause problems with muscles, bones, and other organs. Jane Aubin, scientific director of the Institute of Musculoskeletal Health and Arthritis at the Canadian Institutes of Health Research, said the miners would have to be monitored closely: "They haven't been as physically active as you would want [them] to be, so they have undoubtedly experienced some muscle loss. ... Probably after that extended period of time, in both a confined space and in relative darkness, they've also probably experienced some bone loss."

Officials considered canceling plans for a Thanksgiving Mass for the men and their families at Camp Hope on 17 October over fears that a premature return to the site could be too stressful. "It's not a good idea that they go back to the mine so soon", said psychologist Iturra. Jorge Díaz, head of the miners' medical team at Copiapó regional hospital, said: "We have a group of workers who are absolutely normal people, they weren't selected from a group of applicants to be astronauts, nor were they people who underwent rigorous tests, therefore we don't know when the post-traumatic stress syndrome can appear."

Activities
Some of the rescuers who helped bring the miners to the surface also attended. Reporters and cameras mobbed the miners, prompting the police to intervene to protect them. Omar Reygadas' family was swarmed by the media after they left the service, and his 2-year-old great-granddaughter started crying when pushed by the crowd. As Reygadas picked her up, the cameras zoomed in. Reygadas stayed calm but offered his only answer in response to their questions: "I've had nightmares these days", Reygadas said from inside a small tent while reporters jockeyed for position, "but the worst nightmare is all of you."

Based on their experience, the miners plan to start a foundation to help in the field of mine safety. Yonni Barrios said: "We're thinking about creating a foundation to solve [safety] problems in the mining industry. With this, with the experience that we had had, God help us, we should be able to solve these problems." Juan Illanes told El Mercurio: "We have to decide how to direct our project so this type of thing never happens again. It needs to be done, but these things don't happen quickly".

On 24 October 2010, the miners attended a reception hosted by Piñera at the presidential palace in the capital, Santiago, and were awarded medals celebrating Chile's independence bicentennial. Outside, the men posed for photographs next to the Fénix rescue capsule that had winched them to the surface, now installed in the main square in Santiago. Afterwards, at the National Stadium, the freed miners played a football match against a team that included Piñera; Laurence Golborne, the mining minister; and Jaime Manalich, the health minister. Team  (Hope), led by Franklin Lobos, all wore the number "33", but lost 3–2 to the government team.

In November 2010, miners visited Los Angeles, appearing in a taping of CNN "Heroes." On 13 December 2010, 26 of the rescued miners, including Franklin Lobos, went on invitation to a Manchester United training session at Carrington, Greater Manchester in England. In February 2011, 31 of the 33 miners were hosted by the Israeli Ministry of Tourism for an eight-day pilgrimage of Christian and Jewish holy sites.

Legacy and aftermath

Political
Immediately following the San José mine collapse, Piñera dismissed top officials from the Servicio Nacional de Geología y Minería de Chile (SERNAGEOMIN), Chile's mining regulatory agency and vowed to undertake a major overhaul of the department in light of the accident. In the days following the collapse, eighteen mines were shut down and a further 300 put under threat of possible closure.

On 25 October 2010, ahead of schedule, Piñera received a preliminary report by the Commission on Work Safety established in response to the incident. The report was a direct result of the Copiapó accident and contained 30 proposals ranging from improvements in hygiene to better coordination between local regulatory authorities. Although the commission had set 22 November 2010 as the date to deliver its final report, it reported that job safety inspections in Santiago and regions throughout Chile had allowed them to obtain a clear picture of the situation earlier than anticipated. In total, the commission held 204 hearings and reviewed 119 suggestions that came from online input.
Throughout the incident, Piñera stressed that cost was of no object with regard to rescuing the miners. The operation was expensive with estimates surpassing US$20 million, excluding expenses in building, maintaining and securing  (Camp Hope). These costs exceed the total business debt of the mine's owner, the San Esteban Mining Company, which currently stands at around US$19 million. The state mining company Codelco contributed about 75% to rescue costs with private companies donating services worth more than US$5 million.

The French credit rating agency Coface declared that the dramatic mining rescue would have a positive impact on Chile's economic reputation. "It provides to international investors an image of a country where you can do safe [sic] business", Coface's UK managing director, Xavier Denecker, said. "It gives a good impression in terms of technology, solidarity and efficiency." Coface rates countries according to the probability of private sector companies being successful. Chile holds its highest rating in South America: A2. The UK, in comparison, is rated at A3.

Legal
Following the accident, a lawsuit was filed against the San Esteban Mining Company by relatives of those trapped, while a judge froze US$2 million of its assets. A lawyer for several of the miners' families described this as a refutation of the company's claims of "not having even enough money to pay salaries".

On 21 October, San Esteban Mining Company Operations Chief Carlos Pinilla and mine manager Pedro Simunovic issued a signed public statement insisting that no company official "had the slightest indication that a catastrophe could occur." Miner Jorge Gallardo asserted that there was no way the owners could have been unaware of the situation since he recorded everything and his daily safety reports were signed by Pinilla in person. Rescued miner Victor Zamora commented "What made me sad was that people were dying because the company did not want to have something safer and only thought about money".

Social
Chilean writer and former miner Hernán Rivera Letelier wrote an article for the Spanish newspaper El País offering advice to the miners: "I hope that the avalanche of lights and cameras and flashes that is rushing towards you is a light one. It's true that you've survived a long season in hell, but, when all's said and done, it was a hell you knew. What's heading your way, now, comrades, is a hell that you have not experienced at all: the hell of the show, the alienating hell of TV sets. I've only got one thing to say to you, my friends: grab hold of your family. Don't let them go, don't let them out of your sight, don't waste them. Hold on to them as you hung on to the capsule that brought you out. It's the only way to survive this media deluge that's raining down on you."The Daily Telegraph UK newspaper reported that the miners have hired an accountant to ensure that any income from their new celebrity status is fairly divided, including money from expected book and film deals. The men have agreed to "speak as one" when they discuss their experiences. While still trapped, they appointed one of their group as official biographer and another their poet.

The first TV documentary was aired by Nova on the US Public Broadcasting System on 26 October 2010.Emergency Mine Rescue: Engineers and NASA scientists aid an all-out effort to save 32 Chilean miners trapped nearly half a mile underground, NOVA (PBS), Aired 26 October 2010

Monument

Chilean President Sebastián Piñera has suggested turning Camp Hope into a memorial or museum in honor of the men.

The Fénix 2 capsule used in Operación San Lorenzo has been placed in the Plaza de la Constitución, in front of Chile's presidential palace in Santiago, Chile. Currently, one of the backup capsules is in Copiapó and the other was sent to China for display in Chile's exhibit at the 2010 Shanghai Expo. Discussions are under way for a permanent display of the capsule and possibly a museum. , potential locations include Copiapó, the city closest to the accident site, and Talcahuano,  to the south, where the capsules were built at a Chilean navy workshop. The Fénix 1 capsule was a featured display at the March 2011 Prospectors and Developers Association of Canada convention in Toronto, Ontario, where Laurence Golborne and the rescue team were honored. Since 3 August 2011, the Fénix 2 capsule is displayed at the Atacama Regional Museum in Copiapó.

Books
While still trapped in the mine, the 33 miners chose to collectively contract with a single author to write an official history so that none of the 33 could individually profit from the experiences of others. The miners chose Héctor Tobar, a Pulitzer Prize-winning writer at the Los Angeles Times. Tobar had exclusive access to the miners and in October 2014 published an official account titled Deep Down Dark: The Untold Stories of 33 Men Buried in a Chilean Mine, and the Miracle That Set Them Free. Tobar described the previous books published on the topic as "quick and dirty" with "almost no cooperation from the miners." These books include Trapped: How the World Rescued 33 Miners from 2,000 Feet Below the Chilean Desert (August 2011) by Marc Aronson; Buried Alive!: How 33 Miners Survived 69 Days Deep Under the Chilean Desert (2012) by Elaine Scott; 33 Men: Inside the Miraculous Survival and Dramatic Rescue of the Chilean Miners (October 2011) by Jonathan Franklin."Deals already on offer for Chilean miners' story", STV, 14 October 2010.

Film

A film titled The 33 based on the events of the disaster is directed by Patricia Riggen and written by Mikko Alanne and Jose Rivera. Mike Medavoy, producer of Apocalypse Now'', worked with the miners, their families, and those involved to put the film together. The movie stars Antonio Banderas as Mario "Super Mario" Sepulveda, the public face of video reports sent from underground about the miners' conditions. The actual Sepulveda expressed his enthusiasm and approval towards Banderas playing the role. Brazilian actor Rodrigo Santoro stars as Laurence Golborne, the Chilean Minister of Mining at the time, and American actor Bob Gunton stars as Sebastián Piñera, the President of Chile at the time. The film's plot mostly focuses on the disaster and its aftermath, during which rescue teams attempt to save the trapped miners over the course of three months. According to an interview with Patricia Riggen in 2015, the miners have never been compensated monetarily for their ordeal, and many of them suffer from post-traumatic stress disorder.

See also

 2006 Copiapó mining accident – resulted in two deaths.
 Shandong Qixia Gold Mine Explosion Accident – 22 Elecab miners were trapped and rescued in 2021.
 Floyd Collins – a cave explorer who died after 14 days in 1925. The accident scene was a national media frenzy.
 Kathy Fiscus – a three-year-old Californian girl who died after falling down a well in 1949 and whose two-day rescue attempt was broadcast live on radio and national TV.
 Alfredo Rampi – fell down a well and died as a six-year-old in 1981 in Italy. The rescue attempt was broadcast live for 18 hours.
 Jessica McClure – a Texas toddler who survived being trapped in a well for over two days in 1987, while the rescue operation was televised live on CNN.
 Quecreek Mine rescue – a successful rescue operation of miners using a similar rescue capsule in Pennsylvania in 2002.
 Beaconsfield Mine collapse – two of three Australian miners were rescued in 2006 after two weeks underground. 
 Chasnala mining disaster – incident in India where a flood entered into a coal mine.
 Tham Luang cave rescue – successful rescue involving a football team in Thailand.
 Julen Rosello – Spanish toddler who fell in 2019 in a well and died after a rescue attempt of 13 days.
 Rayan Oram – Moroccan child who fell into a well and died in 2022.

References

External links

Photos
 High-Resolution, Aerial Image of Mine Site, (large image), DigiMapas, October 2010

Videos

  by Canal 13 UC de Chile. 9 October 2010.
 Emergency Mine Rescue, NOVA Documentary, PBS, 53 minutes, 26 October 2010
 Miners Deep Inside Chilean Mine, CBS News, 3 minutes, 27 August 2010
 Rescue Timeline (Plans with Animations), CBS News, 4.5 minutes, 15 October 2010
 
 First of 33 Chilean Miners Rescued  CBS News, 1 minute, 12 October 2010
 Final Chilean Miner Rescued, Fox News, 7 minutes, 14 October 2010
 Miners on the Mend After Rescue, Reuters News, 2 minutes, 14 October 2010
 Chilean Miners: 17 Days Buried Alive, BBC, 1 hour, 12 August 2011
 Sobreviviendo la minería en Chile, TeleSUR, 23 minutes, 13 October 2010 with subtitling in English

 
Mining disasters in Chile
Copiapó mining accident
Copiapo Mining Accident, 2010
Mining rescues
Labor in Chile
History of Atacama Region
Copiapó mining accident
2010 disasters in Chile